Khanuy-Gol (also known as Bulgan Volcanic Field, Chanuj Gol Hanui Gol or Hanuy Gol) is a volcanic field in Mongolia. Khanuy-Gol is located in the northern Hangai range, north of the settlement of Bulgan. 

Baga Togo Uul has one maar-like vent among its three vents, these vents are named Javalach, Togo and Tulga. Both Togo cones have a vegetation cover.

Volcanic activity began 12.5 ± 1.0 mya, with trachybasalts erupting along the Hanui river. The last eruption is not dated, may be in the Holocene though, judging by Uran Uul's steep sided appearance. The Baga Togo Uul cones are certainly older than 3-4 ka and probably Pleistocene. The field is part of the Hangai volcanic region, which is in turn part of the Baikal rift zone. The Hangai region has been subject to tectonic uplift and high heat flow anomalies and hot springs are found.

The rocks erupted by the cones are olivine basalt with inclusions of ilmenite and xenoliths of peridotite in the case of the Togo cones. Some presumably Pleistocene lava flows are basaltic trachyandesites. The Selenga belt of Permian-Triassic age forms the basement of the field.

References 

Volcanic fields
Holocene volcanism
Volcanoes of Mongolia